Isopescu is a Romanian surname. Notable people with the surname include:

Claudiu Isopescu (1894–1956)
Dimitrie Isopescu (1839–1901)
Modest Isopescu (1895–1948)
Constantin Isopescu-Grecul (1871–1938)

Romanian-language surnames